The 1993–94 QMJHL season was the 25th season in the history of the Quebec Major Junior Hockey League. The QMJHL unveils a special logo/patch for its 25th anniversary. The league expands northward, granting an expansion franchise in Val-d'Or, Quebec. Thirteen teams played 72 games each in the schedule. The Laval Titan finished first overall in the regular season winning the Jean Rougeau Trophy. The Chicoutimi Saguenéens won their second President's Cup, defeating Laval in the finals.

Team changes
 The Val-d'Or Foreurs join the league as an expansion franchise, playing in the Lebel Division.

Final standings
Note: GP = Games played; W = Wins; L = Losses; T = Ties; Pts = Points; GF = Goals for; GA = Goals against

Complete list of standings

Scoring leaders
Note: GP = Games played; G = Goals; A = Assists; Pts = Points; PIM = Penalties in Minutes

 Complete scoring statistics

Playoffs
The leading scorers of the playoffs were Danny Beauregard (16 goals, 27 assists) and Aleksey Lozhkin (9 goals, 34 assists) with 43 points each.

First round
 Laval Titan defeated Victoriaville Tigres 4 games to 1.
 Chicoutimi Saguenéens defeated Granby Bisons 4 games to 3.
 Sherbrooke Faucons defeated Saint-Jean Lynx 4 games to 1.
 Drummondville Voltigeurs defeated Verdun Collège Français 4 games to 0.
 Hull Olympiques defeated Saint-Hyacinthe Laser 4 games to 3.
 Beauport Harfangs defeated Shawinigan Cataractes 4 games to 1.

Quarterfinals
Note: GP = Games played; W = Wins; L = Losses; T = Ties; Pts = Points; GF = Goals for; GA = Goals against

‡  Chicoutimi Saguenéens defeated Sherbrooke Faucons in a one-game playoff to determine 4th place in the round-robin standings.

Semifinals
 Laval Titan defeated Beauport Harfangs 4 games to 0.
 Chicoutimi Saguenéens defeated Hull Olympiques 4 games to 3.

Finals
 Chicoutimi Saguenéens defeated Laval Titan 4 games to 2.

All-star teams
First team
 Goaltender - Emmanuel Fernandez, Laval Titan
 Left defence - Joel Bouchard, Verdun Collège Français
 Right defence - Steve Gosselin, Chicoutimi Saguenéens
 Left winger - Michel St. Jacques, Chicoutimi Saguenéens
 Centreman - Yanick Dube, Laval Titan
 Right winger - Eric Daze, Beauport Harfangs
 Coach - Michel Therrien, Laval Titan

Second team
 Goaltender - Philippe DeRouville, Verdun Collège Français
 Left defence - Eric Messier, Sherbrooke Faucons
 Right defence - Stephane Julien, Sherbrooke Faucons
 Left winger - Francois Leroux, Verdun Collège Français
 Centreman - Danny Beauregard, Chicoutimi Saguenéens
 Right winger - Christian Matte, Granby Bisons
 Coach - Richard Martel, Saint-Hyacinthe Laser

Rookie team
 Goaltender - Sylvain Daigle, Shawinigan Cataractes
 Left defence - Jimmy Drolet, Saint-Hyacinthe Laser
 Right defence - Jason Doig, Saint-Jean Lynx
 Left winger - Eric Landry, Saint-Hyacinthe Laser
 Centreman - Christian Dube, Sherbrooke Faucons
 Right winger - Aleksey Lozhkin, Chicoutimi Saguenéens
 Coach - Richard Martel, Saint-Hyacinthe Laser

List of First/Second/Rookie team all-stars

Trophies and awards
Team
President's Cup - Playoff Champions, Chicoutimi Saguenéens
Jean Rougeau Trophy - Regular Season Champions, Laval Titan
Robert Lebel Trophy - Team with best GAA, Verdun Collège Français

Player
Michel Brière Memorial Trophy - Most Valuable Player, Emmanuel Fernandez, Laval Titan
Jean Béliveau Trophy - Top Scorer, Yanick Dube, Laval Titan
Guy Lafleur Trophy - Playoff MVP, Eric Fichaud, Chicoutimi Saguenéens
Shell Cup – Offensive - Offensive Player of the Year, Yanick Dube, Laval Titan
Shell Cup – Defensive - Defensive Player of the Year, Steve Gosselin, Chicoutimi Saguenéens
Transamerica Plaque - Best plus/minus total, Michel St. Jacques, Chicoutimi Saguenéens
Jacques Plante Memorial Trophy - Best GAA, Philippe DeRouville, Verdun Collège Français
Emile Bouchard Trophy - Defenceman of the Year, Steve Gosselin, Chicoutimi Saguenéens
Mike Bossy Trophy - Best Pro Prospect, Eric Fichaud, Chicoutimi Sagueneens
Molson Cup - Rookie of the Year, Christian Matte, Granby Bisons
Michel Bergeron Trophy - Offensive Rookie of the Year, Christian Dube, Sherbrooke Faucons
Raymond Lagacé Trophy - Defensive Rookie of the Year, Jimmy Drolet, Saint-Hyacinthe Laser
Frank J. Selke Memorial Trophy - Most sportsmanlike player, Yanick Dube, Laval Titan
QMJHL Humanitarian of the Year - Humanitarian of the Year, Stephane Roy, Val-d'Or Foreurs
Marcel Robert Trophy - Best Scholastic Player, Patrick Boileau, Laval Titan
Paul Dumont Trophy - Personality of the Year, Yanick Dube, Laval Titan

Executive
Ron Lapointe Trophy - Coach of the Year, Richard Martel, Saint-Hyacinthe Laser
John Horman Trophy - Executive of the Year, Jean-Claude Morrissette, Laval Titan
St-Clair Group Plaque - Marketing Director of the Year, Michel Boisvert, Shawinigan Cataractes

See also
1994 Memorial Cup
1994 NHL Entry Draft
1993–94 OHL season
1993–94 WHL season

References
 Official QMJHL Website
 www.hockeydb.com/

Quebec Major Junior Hockey League seasons
QMJHL